ZNG-FM is a radio station in Nassau, Bahamas broadcasting a religious format to the southern Bahamas.  It is unknown when ZNG-FM began broadcasting, or if the station is still operational.

Radio stations in the Bahamas
Christian radio stations in North America